Canadian Bioinformatics Workshops (CBW) are a series of advanced training workshops in bioinformatics, founded in 1999 in response to an identified need for a skilled bioinformatics workforce in Canada.

1999-2007

The Canadian Bioinformatics Workshops series began offering one and two week short courses in bioinformatics, genomics and proteomics in 1999, in response to an identified need for a skilled bioinformatics workforce in Canada. In partnership with the Canadian Genetics Diseases Network and Human Resources Development Canada, and under the scientific direction of Director, Francis Ouellette, the CBW series was established.

For eight years, the series offered short courses in bioinformatics, genomics and proteomics in various cities across Canada. The courses were taught by top faculty from Canada and the US, and offered small classes and hands-on instruction.

2007-Present

In 2007, the Canadian Bioinformatics Workshops moved to Toronto, where it is now hosted by the Ontario Institute for Cancer Research. A new format and series of workshops were designed in the fall of 2007. It was recognized that with the introduction of new technologies and scientific approaches to research, having the computational biology capacity and skill to deal with this new data has become an even greater asset.

The new series of workshops focuses on training the experts and users of these advanced technologies on the latest approaches used in computational biology to deal with the new data.  The Canadian Bioinformatics Workshops began offering the 2-day advanced topic workshops in 2008.

All workshop material is licensed under a Creative Commons-Share Alike 2.5 license and is available on the Bioinformatics.ca website.

The CBW is sponsored by the Canadian Institute of Health Research and the Ontario Institute for Cancer Research.

References

External links
 

Bioinformatics
Canadian companies established in 1999
Technology companies of Canada